John George Phillips (11 April 1887 – 15 April 1912) was a British sailor and the senior wireless operator aboard the  during her ill-fated maiden voyage in April 1912.
 
On the final evening, Phillips had been exceptionally busy clearing a backlog of messages caused by a wireless breakdown. His consequent failure to respond to incoming signals is cited as a principal cause of the disaster. When the steamship Mesaba sent an ice alert, he acknowledged it, but failed to pass it on to the bridge. Another from the nearby  was ignored altogether. After they struck the iceberg, however, Phillips did his utmost to contact other ships for assistance. He died in the sinking.

Early life
Phillips was born on 11 April 1887 in Farncombe, Surrey. The son of George Alfred Phillips, a draper and Ann (née Sanders), Phillips' family originally came from Trowbridge, Wiltshire, from a lineage of weavers, but moved to Farncombe around 1883. Phillips lived with his five siblings, of whom only two twin sisters survived to adulthood, above a draper's shop – Gammons – which his father managed in Farncombe Street. Educated at a private school on Hare Lane, then St John Street School, Phillips sang as a choirboy at St John the Evangelist – Farncombe's church.

He finished school in 1902 and began working at the Godalming post office, where he learned telegraphy. He started training to work in wireless for the Marconi Company in March 1906, in Seaforth, and graduated five months later in August. Phillips's first assignment was on the White Star Line ship .

RMS Titanic
In March 1912, Phillips was sent to Belfast, Ireland, to be the senior wireless operator on board Titanic for her maiden voyage. He was joined by junior wireless operator Harold Bride. Stories have appeared that Phillips knew Bride before Titanic, but Bride insisted they had never met before Belfast. Titanic sailed for New York City, United States, from Southampton, England, on 10 April 1912, and during the voyage Phillips and Bride transmitted passengers' personal messages and received iceberg warnings and other navigational information from other ships. Phillips celebrated his 25th birthday the day after the voyage began.

On the evening of 14 April, in the wireless room on the boat deck, Phillips was sending messages to Cape Race, Newfoundland, working to clear a backlog of passengers' personal messages that had accumulated when the wireless had broken down the day before. Bride was asleep in the adjoining cabin, intending to relieve Phillips at midnight, two hours early. Shortly after 21:30, Phillips received an ice warning from the steamship Mesaba reporting a large number of icebergs and an ice field directly in Titanics path. Phillips acknowledged Mesabas warning and continued to transmit messages to Cape Race. Mesabas wireless operator waited for Phillips to report that he had given the report to the bridge, but Phillips continued working Cape Race. The message was one of the most important warnings Titanic received, but it was never delivered to the bridge.

Second Officer (Second Mate) Charles Lightoller reports in Chapter 31 of his autobiography: 
Phillips explained when I said that I did not recollect any Mesaba report: "I just put the message under a paper weight at my elbow, just until I squared up what I was doing before sending it to the Bridge." That delay proved fatal and was the main contributory cause to the loss of that magnificent ship and hundreds of lives. Had I as Officer of the Watch, or the Captain, become aware of the peril lying so close ahead and not instantly slowed down or stopped, we should have been guilty of culpable and criminal negligence.

Californians only wireless operator, Cyril Evans, was reporting that they were stopped and surrounded by ice. Californians relative proximity (and the fact that both Evans and Phillips were using spark gap wireless sets whose signals bled across the spectrum and were impossible to tune out) meant that Evans's signal was strong and loud in Phillips's ears, while the signals from Cape Race were faint to Phillips and inaudible to Evans. Phillips quickly sent back, "Keep out; shut up, I'm working Cape Race", and continued communicating with Cape Race, while Evans listened a while longer before going to bed for the night.

It can be argued that this communication had important consequences. Firstly, Evans was giving a warning of ice which, if heeded, could have prevented Titanics sinking. Secondly, Californian was the closest ship to Titanic. As the radio had been switched off by Evans, Phillips had no way of communicating with Californian should Titanic require immediate assistance, which she very soon did.  However, others point out that several ice warnings had already been received and communicated to the captain, so he was aware that there was ice in the area, and a lookout had been posted.

Furthermore, Evans did not request that the message be delivered to the bridge, and the crew of Californian did see the rockets from Titanic at 00:45 and woke their captain, Stanley Lord, who chose to ignore the rockets and returned to bed.

Titanic struck an iceberg at 23:40 that night and began sinking. Bride had woken up and begun getting ready to relieve Phillips when Captain Edward Smith entered the wireless room and told Phillips to prepare to send out a distress signal. Shortly after midnight, Captain Smith came in again and told them to send out the call for assistance and gave them Titanics estimated position. Phillips began sending out the distress signal, code CQD, while Bride took messages to Captain Smith about which ships were coming to Titanics assistance. At one point, Bride jokingly reminded Phillips that the new call was SOS and said, "Send S.O.S., it's the new call, and it may be your last chance to send it." (A myth developed after the disaster that this was the first time SOS was used, but it had been used on other ships previously.)

After taking a quick break, Phillips returned to the wireless room and reported to Bride: the forward part of the ship was flooded, and they should put on more clothes and lifebelts. Bride began to get ready, while Phillips went back to work on the wireless machine.

The wireless power was almost completely out shortly after 02:00, when Captain Smith arrived and told the men they had done their duty and were relieved. Bride later remembered being moved by the way Phillips continued working. While their backs were turned, a crew member (either a stoker or trimmer) sneaked in and attempted to steal Phillips's lifebelt. Bride, outraged at the man's behaviour, attacked the man and might have hit him with an object. The water was beginning to flood the wireless room as they both ran out of the wireless room, leaving the motionless crewman where he fell. The men then split up, Bride heading forward and Phillips heading aft. This was the last time Bride saw Phillips.

Death
Conflicting and contradictory information led to popular belief that Phillips possibly managed to make it to the overturned lifeboat B, which was in the charge of Second Officer Charles Lightoller, along with Harold Bride but did not last the night. In his New York Times interview, Bride said that a man from boat B was dead, and that as he boarded the Carpathia, he saw that the dead man was Phillips. However, Bride, when testifying in the Senate Inquiry, changed his story, saying that he had only been told that Phillips died on Collapsible B, and was later buried at sea from Carpathia and had not witnessed this for himself.

In his book, Colonel Archibald Gracie said a body was transferred from the collapsible onto boat #12 but said that the body was definitely not that of Phillips. He reported that when speaking with Lightoller, the Second Officer agreed with him that the body was not Phillips. In Lightoller's Senate Inquiry testimony, he says that Bride told him that Phillips had been aboard and died on the boat, but it is clear that Lightoller never saw this for himself. In Lightoller's 1935 autobiography, Titanic and Other Ships, he writes that Phillips was aboard Collapsible B and told everyone the position of the various ships they had contacted by wireless, and when they could expect a rescue, before succumbing to the cold and dying. He also claims that Phillips' body was taken aboard Boat No.12 at his insistence.

It is clear from Gracie and other 1912 evidence that the man on the upturned collapsible who called out the names of approaching ships was Harold Bride, not Jack Phillips, as Lightoller thought in 1935. Lightoller's 1912 testimony contradicts his 1935 statements that he saw Phillips aboard B and that the body taken off the boat was Phillips. Salon Steward Thomas Whiteley may have been Bride's source for the story; in a press interview, Whiteley claimed that Phillips had been aboard the collapsible, died and was taken aboard Carpathia; as no other witness in 1912 claimed Phillips' body was recovered, and his name was never mentioned by any source aboard Carpathia as being one of the four bodies buried at sea, it's possible that Whiteley was simply mistaken in his identification, or that if Phillips had been aboard Collapsible B, his body was not recovered.<ref>{{cite web |url=http://wormstedt.com/GeorgeBehe/Page13.htm|title=The Fate of Jack Phillips -George Behe's " Titanic " Tidbits}}</ref>

Legacy

There are memorials to Jack Phillips in Nightingale Cemetery, Farncombe and in the Phillips Memorial Cloister, part of the Phillips Memorial Ground, which lies to the north of the Church of St Peter & St Paul, Godalming.

To mark the 100th anniversary of the sinking, the BBC World Service broadcast, on 10 April 2012, a radio documentary in the "Discovery" series, entitled Titanic – In Her Own Words. The programme was conceived and created by Susanne Weber and was narrated by Sean Coughlan, who had previously written a book on the Titanic radio messages. The programme used voice synthesis to re-create "... the strange, twitter-like, mechanical brevity of the original Morse code messages ... " transmitted by Titanic and neighbouring ships. Messages often included the fashionable slang expressions of the time, such as "old man". The BBC noted that "these messages were recorded at the time in copper-plate handwriting, now scattered across the world in different collections, but together forming a unique archive."

Portrayals
Kenneth Griffith (1958) (A Night to Remember)
 Matt Hill (1996) (Titanic) (TV miniseries)
 Gregory Cooke (1997) (Titanic)
Thomas Lynskey (2012) (The Last Signals) 

Notes

References

Lightoller, C. H., (1935), Titanic and Other Ships'', Nicholson and Watson.

External links

John Phillips' Memorial at Titanic-Titanic.com
Jack Phillips & The Titanic – (Non-commercial site) information and images about Jack Phillips and the memorial to him

1887 births
1912 deaths
Deaths on the RMS Titanic
English sailors
British radio people
Telegraphists
Deaths from hypothermia
People from Godalming
British Merchant Navy officers